James F. Murray House, also known as Murray-Abrams House, was a historic home located at Chester, Hancock County, West Virginia. It was built 1904–1905, and was a blond brick, "L"-shaped dwelling in a combined Classical Revival / American Foursquare style. It featured a deep wraparound porch and porte cochere and slate covered intersecting hipped roofs.  Also on the property is a large -story frame barn built in 1903.  It was the home of James Fraser Murray, (1844-1925), an individual important in the Northern Panhandle's developing oil industry. 
It was listed on the National Register of Historic Places in 1990.

References

Houses on the National Register of Historic Places in West Virginia
Neoclassical architecture in West Virginia
Houses completed in 1905
Houses in Hancock County, West Virginia
National Register of Historic Places in Hancock County, West Virginia
American Foursquare architecture in West Virginia
1905 establishments in West Virginia